Aileen Nicole Coleman-Mullen, known professionally as Nicole C. Mullen, (born January 3, 1967) is an American singer, songwriter, and choreographer. She was born and raised in Cincinnati, Ohio.

Personal life 

During Mullen's first marriage, she endured physical and mental abuse. In 1993, she married singer, songwriter and music producer David Mullen. They divorced in 2014. In a Facebook post, she cited "Biblical reasons" for the divorce. They have three children, one daughter and two sons, one of whom was adopted. In 2016, it was reported that Mullen had entered into a relationship with minister and singer Donnie McClurkin.

Discography 

Studio albums
1991 – Don't Let Me Go
1992 – Wish Me Love
2000 – Nicole C. Mullen
2001 – Talk About It
2002 – Christmas in Black & White
2004 – Everyday People
2007 – Sharecropper's Seed, Vol. 1
2008 – A Dream to Believe In, Vol. 2
2011 – Captivated
2013 – Crown Him: Hymns Old & New
2018 – Like Never Before

Live
2003 – Live from Cincinnati: Bringin' It Home

Compilations
2001 – Following His Hand: A Ten Year Journey
2006 – Redeemer: The Best of Nicole C. Mullen
2009 – The Ultimate Collection

Awards and honors
Mullen was inducted into the Christian Music Hall of Fame in 2011.

GMA Dove Awards

Grammy Award nominations

References

External links 
 

1967 births
American women singers
American performers of Christian music
20th-century African-American women singers
Christian music songwriters
Living people
Musicians from Cincinnati
People from Rockwall, Texas
21st-century African-American people
21st-century African-American women